The 2005 American Basketball Association All-Star Game was held at the 17,923 seat Thomas & Mack Center in Las Vegas, where West defeated East, 163–149. Lou Kelly of the Las Vegas Rattlers was named the Most Valuable Player. The big names of the event were the former NBA players Lawrence Moten, Joe Crispin, Todd Day and Anthony Miller. The latter who played 7 seasons in the NBA joined Atlanta Vision mid-season from the Atlanta Hawks.

The best players of the 2005 All-Star game
The winning West team was led by Lou Kelly, a UNLV who graduate scored 32 points in the All-Star game and was named the game MVP, Daryl Dorsey from Indiana who added 26 points and Todd Day with 25. The best player for the Eats teams was Randy Gill who performed for 27 points, 15 rebounds and 10 assists. Antwain Barbour and Willie Shaw with 25 and 23 points respectively, also shone for the East All-Stars.

All-Star Teams

Rosters

Former NBA players
 Anthony Miller
 Todd Day 
 Lawrence Moten
 Joe Crispin

See also

2006 ABA All-Star Game

References

External links
ABALive.com/AllStar  – Official website of the 2005 ABA All-Star Game

ABA All-Star Games
2004–05 in American basketball